Jërullah Hesamidin (born June 1962) is a Chinese politician of Uyghur origin who has been vice chairman of Xinjiang Uyghur Autonomous Region since January 2013. He previously served as mayor of Ürümqi, the capital of Xinjiang, from 2009 to 2013.

Biography
Jërullah Hesamidin was born in Artux, Xinjiang, in June 1962. He entered the workforce in November 1980, and joined the Chinese Communist Party (CCP) in December 1986. He studied as a part-time student at China Youth University of Political Studies, Tianjin University, Central Party School of the Chinese Communist Party and Xinjiang University of Finance and Economics.

He served in various posts in Kashgar Prefecture before serving as magistrate of Yopurga County in March 1994. He was eventually promoted to vice governor in March 1999. In February 2005, he was assigned to Aksu Prefecture and appointed governor, a position he held until February 2008. In February 2008, he was named acting mayor of Ürümqi, a major city and the capital of Xinjiang. He was installed as mayor in February 2009. In January 2013, he rose to become vice chairman of Xinjiang Uyghur Autonomous Region.

References

1962 births
Living people
People from Artux
Uyghur politicians
China Youth University of Political Studies alumni
Tianjin University alumni
Central Party School of the Chinese Communist Party alumni
Xinjiang University of Finance and Economics alumni
People's Republic of China politicians from Xinjiang
Chinese Communist Party politicians from Xinjiang
Mayors of Ürümqi